This article lists the winners and nominees for the NAACP Image Award for Outstanding Album. This award has been given since the 1988 ceremony and since its conception, Whitney Houston and Beyoncé holds the record for most wins in this category with four.

Winners and nominees
Winners are listed first and highlighted in bold.

1980s

1990s

2000s

2010s

2020s

Multiple wins and nominations

Wins

 4 wins
 Whitney Houston
 Beyoncé

 2 wins
 Jennifer Hudson
 Alicia Keys

Nominations

 7 nominations
 Beyoncé
 Alicia Keys

 6 nominations
 Mary J. Blige

 5 nominations
 Whitney Houston

 4 nominations
 John Legend
 Jill Scott
 Kanye West

 3 nominations
 Brandy
 Chris Brown
 H.E.R.
 Jennifer Hudson
 India Arie
 Michael Jackson
 Kendrick Lamar

 2 nominations
 Toni Braxton
 Mariah Carey
 Seal
 Usher
 Luther Vandross
 Charlie Wilson

References

American music awards
NAACP Image Awards
Album awards